Christopher Howell (born August 29, 1945) is an American poet, editor, and educator. He has published nine books of poetry.

Born in Portland, Oregon, Howell served as a journalist for the U.S. Navy during the Vietnam War. He earned a B.S. from Oregon State University in 1968, an M.A. from Portland State University in 1971, and an MFA from the MFA Program for Poets & Writers at the University of Massachusetts Amherst in 1973. He also attended Pacific Lutheran University in Tacoma, Washington.

Starting 1972, Howell served as the director and principal editor for Lynx House Press which awards the Blue Lynx Prize for Poetry.  Lynx House was founded in Amherst, Massachusetts, USA, in the 1970s by Christopher Howell with David Lyon, and Helena Minton, with the press moving to its present location in Spokane, Washington in 1996 where in 2005 Lynx House became an impress of Eastern Washington University Press but in 2010 became an independent and non-profit literary publisher. The press, in addition to hosting the Blue Lynx Prize, also publishes other books of poetry.

Howell is also editor of Willow Springs Books, director of the former Eastern Washington University Press, and on the faculty of the Master of Fine Arts Program in Creative Writing at Eastern Washington University.

His daughter, Emma Howell, was an aspiring poet and student at Oberlin College who died at age 20 in June 2001. Her family published her poems posthumously in a volume titled Slim Night of Recognition.

Christopher Howell lives in Spokane, Washington.

Books of poetry

The Crime of Luck
Sweet Afton: Poems
Sea Change
Though Silence: The Ling Wei Poems
Memory and Heaven
Just Waking
Light's Ladder
Dreamless and Possible: Poems New and Selected
Gaze

Awards

National Endowment for the Arts fellowships (won two)
Oregon Arts Commission grant
Washington State Governor's Award (1986)
Vi Gale Award
Adrienne Lee Award
Pushcart Prizes (three)
Vachel Lindsay prize
Helen Bullis prize

Other publications
Howell's poems have been anthologized (including twice in the Pushcart Anthology) and have appeared in journals, including Harper's, The Hudson Review, The Iowa Review, Poetry Northwest and The Gettysburg Review.

References

External links
Christopher Howell at the National Endowment for the Arts

1945 births
Poets from Oregon
American book editors
American educators
Oregon State University alumni
University of Massachusetts Amherst MFA Program for Poets & Writers alumni
Journalists from Portland, Oregon
Writers from Spokane, Washington
Living people
Portland State University alumni
Pacific Lutheran University alumni
Educators from Oregon